Marcos Martins dos Anjos, sometimes known as Marcos (Souto Soares, July 24, 1989), is a Brazilian footballer who acts as right back for Botafogo-PB.

Career
Marcos Martins was revealed by the basic categories of Cruzeiro, however, was soon borrowed the basic categories of Ipatinga where he disputed the Campeonato Brasileiro Sub-20 2008.

In the year 2009 was loaned again, this time for Itaúna, where the team competed in the Campeonato Mineiro Módulo II. That same year, he went to the Bahia where he was cast in the Brazilian Championship team in Serie B. Initially, the team was hired to work in the Bahia-based divisions, but with the sudden departure of an injury to Patrick and Dede, was promoted to principal owner of the team in a match against Ceará Sporting Club, and did not disappoint. Charmed the crowd at Pituaçu and became absolute owner of Bahia.

In 2010 it was confirmed to join the cast of Cruzeiro, but was not seized at the time and training remained separate from the main group. Later that year, was loaned to Avaí.

Career statistics
(Correct )

Honours
Cruzeiro
Copa São Paulo de Futebol Júnior: 2007

 Ipatinga
 Campeonato Mineiro - Módulo II: 2009

 Avaí
 Campeonato Catarinense: 2010

 Vitória
 Campeonato Baiano: 2013

 Ceará
 Campeonato Cearense: 2014

 CRB
 Campeonato Alagoano: 2016, 2017

References

External links
 soccerway
 ogol.com
 Avaí
 Antoniu's - Marcos

1989 births
Living people
Brazilian footballers
Cruzeiro Esporte Clube players
Esporte Clube Itaúna players
Avaí FC players
Esporte Clube Bahia players
Atlético Clube Goianiense players
Esporte Clube Vitória players
Ceará Sporting Club players
Clube de Regatas Brasil players
Botafogo Futebol Clube (SP) players
Santa Cruz Futebol Clube players
Esporte Clube São Bento players
Campeonato Brasileiro Série A players
Campeonato Brasileiro Série B players
Campeonato Brasileiro Série C players
Association football fullbacks